Twelve Rounds to Glory: The Story of Muhammad Ali is a 2007 illustrated biography of Muhammad Ali for children written by Charles R. Smith Jr. and illustrated by Bryan Collier. Smith won an author honor at the 2008 Coretta Scott King Book Awards for this book.

References

2007 non-fiction books
American biographies
Biographies about African-American people
Books about Muhammad Ali
Candlewick Press books